A drawl is a perceived feature of some varieties of spoken English and generally indicates slower, longer vowel sounds and diphthongs. The drawl is often perceived as a method of speaking more slowly and may be erroneously attributed to laziness or fatigue. That particular speech pattern exists primarily in varieties of English, the most noticeable of which are Southern American English, Broad Australian English, and Broad New Zealand English. It is believed to have its origin in the 1590-1600s Dutch or Low German word "dralen" /ˈdraːlə(n)/, meaning "to linger."

The most commonly-recognized Southern Drawl features the diphthongization or triphthongization of the traditional short front vowels, as in the words pat, pet, and pit, especially at the end of sentences.

Southern drawl 

The Southern American English drawl, or "Southern drawl," involves vowel diphthongization of the front pure vowels, or the "prolongation of the most heavily stressed syllables, with the corresponding weakening of the less stressed ones, so that there is an illusion of slowness even though the tempo may be fast."

Characteristics 
One characteristic of southern drawl is vowel breaking. A monophthong changes into a diphthong or triphthong. The southern drawl has the short front vowels [æ], [ɛ], and [ɪ] become accompanied by an off-glide [ə], also known as a schwa, such as in the words pat [pæ(ə)t], pet [pɛ(ə)t], and pit [pɪ(ə)t].

That is accompanied in older Southern American English by a second very noticeable characteristic, known as the loss of postvocalic /r/, or r-dropping. Along with the elongation of the vowels, in words with /r/ immediately after a laxed vowel or appearing at the end of an utterance, the /r/ is dropped altogether and is usually replaced by a schwa, or velar glide. That is the most easily recognizable form of drawl among English-speakers.

         sat [sæt] > [sæi̯ət]
           set [sɛt] > [sɛi̯ət]
             sit [sɪt] > [sɪi̯ət]

 Glide (schwa): pitch lowers, stretches in central vowels, and becomes lax
 Monophthongs, Diphthongs, and Triphthongs: singular, doublet, and triplet vowel sounds in an utterance: "Ha," "Heya," "Greetings!"

History 
With their settlement of the Americas by immigrants from southern England and Scotland, where r-dropping dialects had become popularized by prestige and adopted by the majority of speakers, drawling speech already had some root in the English language. As agriculture became more relevant, Southern European settlers slowly migrated south towards the prime farmlands of tidewater zones along the southern coast. Scottish immigrants, meanwhile, moved west and then south, following the major waterways.

The already-popular r-dropping speaking patterns became more and more pronounced over time by the drawing out of vowels, which is familiar today. Meanwhile, as slavery took hold in the economy of southern plantations, more and more black people were introduced to the r-dropping drawl pattern of English through their captors.

Meanwhile, the Northern European drawl moved south from the midwest, bringing its own r-retaining speech patterns to the mix. Rather than dropping postvocalic /r/, the Northern speech emphasized it.

In the 1900s, well after the different speech patterns had established themselves to some degree in both the white and black populations of the Southern United States, the Great Migration (African American) drew large swathes of blacks and their mixed form of drawling speech to the areas along the Sun Belt and west coast. That speech pattern had already become somewhat established as today's African American Vernacular English, and is by far the most common form of r-dropping southern speech.

Social perceptions 
A drawl in Southern English is often associated with social stereotypes, both positive and negative. Studies have shown that American adults tend to attribute Southern English with friendliness and Northern English with intelligence. Many people consider Northern English a neutral, unmarked variety and do not even realize that it is an accent. The Southern drawl is associated with negative stereotypes with regard to intelligence and work ethic, with a drawl coming across as lazy or unintelligent. A study in 2011 by Rakic and others showed evidence that when people categorize others, a person's accent mattered more than apparent ethnicity.

In 2014, the US Department of Energy at the Oak Ridge National Laboratory in Tennessee offered a voluntary "Southern Accent Reduction" classes so that employees could be "remembered for what they said rather than their accents." The course offered accent neutralization through codeswitching. The class was canceled because of the resulting controversy and complaints from Southern employees, who were offended by the class since it stigmatized Southern accents. That event demonstrated that a bias exists against Southern American English, with Northern varieties being favored by some employers.

In a study of children's attitudes about accents, Tennessee children from 5 to 6 were indifferent about the qualities of persons with different accents, but children from Chicago were not. Chicago children from 5 to 6, who spoke Northern English, were much more likely to attach positive traits to Northern-speakers. The study's results suggest that social perceptions of Southern English are taught by parents to children and exist for no biological reason.

Broad Australian 
Broad Australian likely emerged from New South Wales, in southeastern Australia, in the early 1800s, when the population was significantly increasing by the importation of convicts. Many of the convicts came from Britain and Ireland, the origin of Broad Australian. However, the area was relatively isolated from outside influences which fostered the growth of a new dialect. In the late 1800s, people from New South Wales began to move to other parts of the continent because of increased overseas immigration, gold rushes, and other factors.

Vowel changes 
/oʊ/ has a lowered first target and a lowered and fronted second target

/u/ is lowered

/i/ significant onglide - The degree of this onglide is affected by age and is less marked by younger speakers than older speakers

/ɜ/ is fronted

/aʊ/ has a fronted and raised first target

/eɪ/ has a retracted first target

/aɪ/ has a retracted and raised first target

/ɪə/ has a diminished offglide

/ɛə/ has a diminished offglide

The "cavalry drawl" was a phenomenon of English-speaking officers in England, which was noted around 1840. Officers in certain cavalry regiments considered to be fashionable would affect a drawling delivery in their speech.

Broad New Zealand 
Broad New Zealand, much like Broad Australian, began taking hold in the late 1800s when people from the British Isles brought their varieties of English to New Zealand. Its drawl in is caused by vowel shifts and diphthongization.

Sources

References 

English phonology